Live at Town Hall may refer to:

 Eels with Strings: Live at Town Hall, a 2006 album by Eels
 Live at Town Hall (Klezmatics album), 2011